Boo! is the fifth studio album by the band Was (Not Was). It was their first new album since 1990. The cover illustration was by David Was.

Track listing
All tracks composed by David Was and Don Was; except where indicated
 "Semi-Interesting Week" – 4:49
 "It's a Miracle" – 4:40
 "Your Luck Won't Last" – 3:28
 "From the Head to the Heart" – 4:15
 "Big Black Hole" – 4:47
 "Needletooth" – 2:14
 "Forget Everything" – 5:16
 "Crazy Water" – 4:48
 "Mr. Alice Doesn't Live Here Anymore" (Bob Dylan, David Was, Don Was) – 4:05
 "Green Pills in the Dresser" – 3:11

Personnel

 Don Was – bass, percussion, keyboards, programming, vocals
 David Was – flute, harmonica, keyboards, vocals, cover illustration
 Sweet Pea Atkinson – vocals
 Sir Harry Bowens – vocals
Donald Ray Mitchell – vocals
Kris Kristofferson – vocals on "Green Pills in the Dresser"
Randy Jacobs – guitar
Val McCallum – guitar
Wayne Kramer – guitar
 Rayse Biggs – trumpet
Lee Thornton – trumpet
Marcus Miller – bass
Tim Drummond – bass
 Curt Bisquera – drums
James Gadson – drums
Lenny Castro – percussion
Jamie Muhoberac – keyboards
Luis Resto – keyboards
Booker T. Jones – Hammond organ
Greg Leisz – pedal steel
 David McMurray – saxophone
 Stephen Kupka – baritone saxophone
David Campbell – strings
Arnold McCuller, Myrna Smith, Portia Griffin, Sally Dworsky – backing vocals
Engineering and mixing – Don Was, Krish Sharma, Rik Pekkonen

References

Was (Not Was) albums
2008 albums
Albums arranged by David Campbell (composer)
Albums produced by Don Was
Albums produced by David Was
Rykodisc albums